Akiyi is an autonomous community in Umulokpa, Uzo-Uwani Local Government Area (LGA), Enugu State, Nigeria. It has Seven (7) villages namely: Enugwu, Enugwu-Uwani, Imama, Nkwelle, Ukpali, Uwani and Uwenu.

Religion
Christianity, Odinana and neutralist.

Church 
The churches in Akiyi are namely:
Holy Cross Parish (Catholic)
St. Stephen's Church (Anglican)
Deeper Life Bible Church (Pentecostal)
Watchman Catholic Charismatic Renewal Movement (Pentecostal)
The Lord's Chosen Charismatic Movement (Pentecostal)etc.

Culture
Akiyi shares cultural traits with its neighbouring communities which are consistent with general Igbo culture. Other festivals include; the New yam festival, the Amaji festival and the Ibone (Mmanwu) festival which is held between July and September of every year.
The Royal Highness of Akiyi-Umulokpa is Chief Engr. Vincent I.A. Ekwedigwe; The Igwe Ijagwo.

Age grade system
Akiyi practices Republican method of governance in which power is devolved to age grades. Each age grade consists of people within three years age bracket.

Notable people
 Hon. Cornell Chijioke Onwubuya (Agunkwo Igbo); Politician, Administrator, former Executive Chairman, Uzo-Uwani LGA, former SSA to former Governor Sullivan Chime on Investment Promotion and, a former Commissioner under the Executive Governor of Enugu state, Rt. Hon. Ifeanyi Ugwuanyi (Gburugburu). And, SSA on Special Duties to Executive Governor, Ifeanyi Lawrence Ugwuanyi of Enugu State.
 Hon. Charles Anumudu; Educationist, Researcher,  PhD Economist
 Oliver A. Odenigbo; Lecturer Dept. of Estate Management, (I.M.T) Enugu
 Udemezue Sylverster; Legal Practitioner & Lecturer at Nigerian Law School, Lagos
 Nwabueze Darlington C.; Economist/International Trade analyst and, a Chinese language instructor/translator

References

Populated places in Enugu State